Mutaz Abdullah is the veteran goalkeeper for Al-Shaab. He previously represented the UAE national team on 25 occasions.

Abdulla started off in the youth teams of Al Sadd in Qatar, the country where he grew up. He joined Al Ain in 1998 and was one of the three goalkeepers for the team. Honors he has received with Al Ain include the AFC Champions league trophy.

Honors
 UAE League Titles: 99/2000, 2001/2002, 2002/2003, 2003/2004
 UAE Presidents Cup: 1998/1999, 2000/2001, 2004/2005, 2005/2006, 2008/2009
 UAE FA Cup: 2004/2005, 2005/2006
 AFC Champions League: 2003
 UAE Super Cup: 2002/2003
Etisalat Emirates Cup 2008/2009

References

External links

1974 births
Living people
Emirati footballers
United Arab Emirates international footballers
Al Ain FC players
Ajman Club players
Al Wahda FC players
Al-Shaab CSC players
Emirates Club players
Emirati football managers
Emirati people of Sudanese descent
UAE Pro League players
Association football goalkeepers